Chemicalize is an online platform for chemical calculations, search, and text processing.
It is developed and owned by ChemAxon and offers various cheminformatics tools in freemium model: chemical property predictions, structure-based and text-based search, chemical text processing, and checking compounds with respect to national regulations of different countries.

Modules of Chemicalize
Calculations
Chemical property predictions for any molecule structure. Available calculations include elemental analysis, names and identifiers (IUPAC name, SMILES, InChI), pKa, logP/logD, and solubility.

Chemical Search
Structure-based and text-based search against the Chemicalize database to find web page sources and associated structures of the results.

Compliance Checker
Checking compounds with respect to national regulations of several countries on narcotics, psychotropic drugs, explosives, hazardous materials, and toxic agents.

Short history
January 2009 Original service launched
The service was launched with the brand name chemicalize.org. The main purpose was to identify chemical names on websites, but other services were also provided, such as property predictions and chemical search.

August 2010 ChemSpider integration
Predicted chemical properties provided by Chemicalize were integrated to ChemSpider. ChemSpider record pages contain links to access predicted properties on Chemicalize for the considered structure.

September 2016 Renewed version
The platform was renewed using a new brand name Chemicalize. The new version offers enriched functionality in freemium model.

May 2018 Chemicalize Professional released
Embeddable web components and hosted cheminformatics services, for web developers and integrators, based on Chemicalize cloud infrastructure.

List of the predicted structure-based properties

IUPAC name
InChI name
pKa
logP and logD
Solubility
NMR spectroscopy
Isoelectric point
Charge
Polarizability
Topology Analysis
Geometry data
Polar Surface Area
Hydrogen bond Donor-Acceptor
Refractivity
Structural Framework
Lipinski's Rule of Five

See also
ChemAxon
ChemSpider

References

External links
Chemicalize
CCblog about the chemicalize.org's beta release
The bbgm blog's article about the chemicalize.org by Deepak Singh
ChemAxon extends chemicalize.org, article in Drug Discovery World
Article on SYS-CON media
Article on Fierce BioTech
Drug Discovery Opinion article
Useful Free Tools for HPLC Method Development
Why is pH adjustment important for sample prep methods?

Chemical databases
Computational chemistry software